This article describes all the 2013 seasons of Formula Renault series across the world.

Formula Renault 3.5L

Formula Renault 2.0L

2013 Formula Renault 2.0 Eurocup season

2013 Formula Renault 2.0 Northern European Cup season

2013 Formula Renault 2.0 Alps season

2013 Protyre Formula Renault Championship season

2013 Pau Trophy
On 20 May 2013, first non-championship Pau Trophy for Formula Renault 2.0 was held. The main race was won by Prema Powerteam driver Luca Ghiotto.

2013 Asian Formula Renault Series season

Formula Renault 1.6L

2013 French F4 Championship season

2013 Formula Renault 1.6 NEC season
Point system : 30, 24, 20, 17, 16, 15, 14, 13, 12, 11, 10, 9, 8, 7, 6, 5, 4, 3, 2, 1 for 20th. No points for Fastest lap or Pole position.
Races : 2 race by rounds length of 20 minutes each.

2013 Formula Renault 1.6 Nordic season

2013 Formula Renault 1.6 NEZ season

Other Formulas powered by Renault championships

2013 V de V Challenge Monoplace season

2013 Remus Formula Renault 2.0 Cup season
The season was held between 7 April and 11 September and raced across Austria, Germany and Czech Republic. The races occur with other categories as part of the Austria Formula 3 Cup, this section presents only the Austrian Formula Renault 2.0 classifications. Division II cars were built between 2000 - 2009.

2013 Formula Renault 2.0 Argentina season
All cars use Tito 02 chassis, all races were held in Argentina.

1 extra point in each race for regularly qualified drivers.

References

Renault
Formula Renault seasons